Get on the Bus: Music from and Inspired by the Motion Picture is the soundtrack to the 1996 feature film Get on the Bus, released in October 1996 on Interscope Records. The soundtrack reached No. 38 on the Billboard Top R&B/Hip-Hop Albums chart.

Singles
Curtis Mayfield's "New World Order" peaked at No. 14 on the Billboard Adult R&B Airplay chart.

Track listing

References

1996 soundtrack albums
Interscope Records soundtracks